Daren Wilkinson (born February 11, 1972) is an American football coach and former player. He served as the head football coach at Texas A&M University–Kingsville from 2015 to 2019. Wilkinson played college football at Colorado State University where he was a starting quarterback.

Head coaching record

References

External links
 Texas A&M–Kingsville profile

1972 births
Living people
American football quarterbacks
Colorado State Rams football players
Colorado State Rams football coaches
CSU Pueblo ThunderWolves football coaches
Fayetteville State Broncos football coaches
Ricks Vikings football players
South Dakota State Jackrabbits football coaches
Texas A&M–Kingsville Javelinas football coaches